Khaled Afarah (born 21 January 1974) is a Yemeni football defender who played for Al-Tilal.

Honours

Al-Tilal'
 Yemeni League: 1990–91, 2004/05
 Yemeni Presidents Cup: 2007
 Yemeni Naseem Cup: 2003
 Yemeni Ali Muhsin al-Murisi Cup: 2003

External links 
 

1974 births
Living people
Yemeni footballers
Yemen international footballers
Yemeni expatriate footballers
Yemeni expatriate sportspeople in Lebanon
Expatriate footballers in Lebanon
Association football defenders
Footballers at the 2002 Asian Games
Al-Tilal SC players
Tadamon Sour SC players
Al-Wehda Club (Sana'a) players
Yemeni League players
Asian Games competitors for Yemen
Lebanese Premier League players